Patti Bill Nicholls (born 3 June 1993) is a Ni-Vanuatu footballer who plays as a forward for Magenta. He made his debut for the national team in November 2015 in their 2–1 win against Fiji in which he scored the second goal.

Personal life
Bill is the son of former Vanuatu national rep, Morsen Nicholls, who now lives in New Caledonia.

Career statistics
Scores and results list Vanuatu's goal tally first, score column indicates score after each Nicholls goal.

References

External links
 
 

1993 births
Living people
Vanuatuan footballers
Association football defenders
Vanuatu international footballers
Vanuatu youth international footballers
2016 OFC Nations Cup players
Tafea F.C. players
AS Magenta players